Professor Kandiah David Arulpragasam (16 September 1931 – 7 August 2003) was a Sri Lankan Tamil academic. He was the first vice-chancellor of Eastern University, Sri Lanka.

Early life and family
Arulpragasam was born on 16 September 1931. He was educated at the S. Thomas' College, Mount Lavinia, St. John's College, Jaffna, Hartley College and Ananda College. After school he joined the University of Ceylon, Colombo from where he graduated with BSc degree in zoology. He then went to the UK for postgraduate studies. He gained a Phd in marine zoology from the University of Wales. He then did post-doctoral training in oceanography at the University of Southampton.

Arulpragasam never married but lived with his brother (Arulanantham) and sister-in-law (Padma).

Career
Arulpragasam joined the Department of Zoology at the Faculty of Science, University of Colombo, becoming Professor of Zoology in 1973. He was Dean of the Faculty of Science for a couple of years.

Arulpragasam was appointed Director of Batticaloa University College in April 1985. The college was given full university status in October 1986 and Arulpragasam became its first vice-chancellor.

In October 1996 Arulpragasam was appointed Vice Chairman (Planning) of the second National Education Commission. He was chairman of the Central Environmental Authority and First Associate Director of the Institute of Fundamental Studies. He was also a member of the University Grants Commission and the Governing Council of the National Aquatic Research and Resources Development Authority. He was president of the National Academy of Sciences between 1995 and 1997.

Death
Arulpragasam died in Colombo on 7 August 2003.

Research Publications
 Arudpragasam K.D. and Costa H.H. Atyidae of Ceylon.I. Crustaceana, 1962; 4: 1-24.
Journal of Experimental Biology, 1964; 41: 299–307.
Journal of Experimental Biology, 1964; 41: 309–321.
 Arudpragasam K.D. and Naylor E. Patterns of gill ventilation in some decapod Crustacea. Journal of Zoology, 1966; 150: 401–411.

References

1931 births
2003 deaths
Academic staff of the University of Colombo
Alumni of Ananda College
Alumni of Hartley College
Alumni of St. John's College, Jaffna
Alumni of S. Thomas' College, Mount Lavinia
Alumni of the University of Ceylon (Colombo)
Alumni of the University of Southampton
Alumni of the University of Wales
Sri Lankan Tamil academics
Sri Lankan Tamil writers
Vice-Chancellors of the Eastern University, Sri Lanka